Jiangsu cuisine, also known as Su cuisine, is one of the Eight Culinary Traditions of Chinese cuisine. It is derived from the native cooking styles of Jiangsu Province. In general, Jiangsu cuisine's texture is characterised as soft, but not to the point of mushy or falling apart. In addition, Jiangsu cuisine also focuses on heating temperature. For example, the meat tastes quite soft but would not separate from the bone when picked up. As the style of Jiangsu cuisine is typically practised near the sea, fish is a very common ingredient in cooking. Other characteristics include the strict selection of ingredients according to the seasons, with emphasis on the matching colour and shape of each dish and using soup to improve flavour. The municipality of Shanghai was formerly a part of Jiangsu thus the great deal of similarity between the two, and Shanghai cuisine is sometimes classified as a part of Jiangsu cuisine.

Regional variations
Jiangsu cuisine is sometimes simply called Su cuisine, and one of its major styles is Huaiyang cuisine. Although Huaiyang cuisine is one of several sub-regional styles within Jiangsu cuisine, it is widely seen in Chinese culinary circles as the most popular and prestigious style of Jiangsu cuisine – to a point where it is considered to be one of the four most influential regional schools that dominate the culinary heritage of China, along with Cantonese cuisine, Shandong cuisine and Sichuan cuisine.

Jiangsu cuisine actually consists of several other sub-regional styles, including:

 Nanjing style: Its dishes emphasise an even taste and matching colours, with dishes incorporating river fish/shrimp and duck.
 Suzhou style: The emphasis is on the selection of ingredients. It has a stronger taste than Nanjing style cuisine as well as a tendency to be sweeter than the other varieties of Jiangsu cuisine.
 Wuxi style: Wuxi's proximity to Lake Tai means it is notable for wide variety of freshwater produce, such as the "Three Whites" – white bait, white fish and white shrimp.
 Nantong style: The dishes emphasise a flavour of freshness on the ingredients which cover a variety of seafood, since Nantong is located at the intersection of the local Hao River, the Yangtze River and the Yellow Sea.

Wuxi-style cuisine
In Wuxi, the common cooking method is characterised by the addition of sugar and soy sauce to many savoury dish often in the form of hongshao. This often results in a fragrant, caramelised flavour. In addition, Wuxi cuisine often has sweeter versions of dishes found in its neighbouring regions.

Notable Wuxi dishes include:

See also
 List of Chinese dishes

References

External links 
 China Daily on Jiangsu cuisine
 To taste Jiangsu is to know China
 China.com description

 
Regional cuisines of China